Myx is a music channel in the Philippines that shows different music videos, domestically and internationally. Every week, its MYX Hit Chart presents the Top 20 favorite music videos voted by People's choice.

In 2016, several acts topped the Myx Hit Chart and nineteen singles made at the summit. Singer Sarah Geronimo kicked off the year with "Minamahal" as it ran for a week and began its reign at the latter part of 2015. Some artists including Darren Espanto made the most number ones with 5. James Reid and Juan Karlos Labajo also gave multiple number ones, both have 2. On January 1 of 2017, Sarah Geronimo's "Tala" became the Myx Hit Chart's Number One Music Video of 2016.

Chart history

Chart history of Myx International Top 20

See also 
Myx Music Awards 2016

References

External links

2016 in the Philippines
Philippine record charts